Giimbiyu is an extinct Aboriginal Australian language isolate once spoken by the Giimbiyu people of northern Australia.

The name Giimbiyu is a Gaagudju word for 'of the stoney country'. It was introduced in Harvey (1992) as a cover term for the named dialects,

Mangerr (Mengerrdji)
Urningangga (Wuningak) and Erri (Arri)

In 1997 Nicholas Evans proposed an Arnhem Land family that includes the Giimbiyu languages. However, they are not included in Bowern (2011).

Vocabulary
Capell (1942) lists the following basic vocabulary items:

{| class="wikitable sortable"
! gloss !! Mangeri !! Uningangk
|-
! man
|  || 
|-
! woman
|  || 
|-
! head
|  || 
|-
! eye
|  || 
|-
! nose
|  || 
|-
! mouth
|  || 
|-
! tongue
|  || 
|-
! stomach
|  || 
|-
! bone
|  || 
|-
! blood
|  || 
|-
! kangaroo
|  || 
|-
! opossum
|  || 
|-
! emu
|  || 
|-
! crow
|  || 
|-
! fly
|  || 
|-
! sun
|  || 
|-
! moon
|  || 
|-
! fire
|  || 
|-
! smoke
|  || 
|-
! water
|  || 
|}

References

 McConvell, Patrick and Nicholas Evans. (eds.) 1997. Archaeology and Linguistics: Global Perspectives on Ancient Australia. Melbourne: Oxford University Press

Language isolates of Australia
Extinct languages of the Northern Territory